The Carpentaria fine-lined slider (Lerista carpentariae)  is a species of skink found in the Northern Territory in Australia.

References

Lerista
Reptiles described in 1983
Taxa named by Allen Eddy Greer